K-266 Orel is a Project 949AM (Antey modernized) nuclear-powered cruise missile submarine (SSGN) (NATO codename Oscar II).  She is one of three Oscar II submarines still serving in the Russian Northern Fleet, all assigned to the 11th Submarine Division, berthed at Guba Bolshaya Lopatka (part of Zapadnaya Litsa, also known as Zaozersk), on the Kola Peninsula northwest of Severomorsk.

History
She was laid down at the Sevmash Shipyard in Severodvinsk on 19 January 1989. From 1991 to 1993 she was known as Severodvinsk, but was renamed Orel on 20 March 1993 or 6 April 1993 and entered service with the Russian Navy that same year. Between May 2004 and September 2007 her commander was Valery Varfolomeyev, an officer who had first joined the submarine as assistant commander in June 1998, and then became senior assistant to the commander from April 2000.

The Russian newspaper Izvestia reported that Orel is to be overhauled in 2013. She is to have her shaft-line changed to correct problems during construction that left her very easily tracked by sonar. Additionally, her P-700 Granit (NATO codename SS-N-19 Shipwreck) antiship submarine launched cruise missiles (SLCM) will be replaced by more modern, supersonic, P-800 Oniks (NATO codename SS-N-26) antiship SLCMs. The overhaul was completed and the ship returned to service in 2017.

2015 fire
Whilst in dock at the Zvezdochka shipyard on 7 April 2015, it was reported that a fire broke out "in the ninth section of the sub close to the stern". The fire was caused by insulation materials catching fire during welding. It was reported the submarine did not have nuclear weapons or fuel on board at the time.

2017
First modernized unit, Project 949AM.

2021
In July 2021, while returning to Northern Fleet waters from Navy Day commemorations in St. Petersburg, Orel was reported to have "lost power" while transitting on the surface through the Danish straits. She was reported to have been assisted by other Russian vessels accompanying her through the straits. The submarine was later reported to have restored power and continued her transit north submerged.

References

See also
List of Russian military accidents

Oscar-class submarines
Ships built in the Soviet Union
1992 ships
2015 fires in Europe
2015 disasters in Russia
Fires in Russia
Maritime incidents in 2015
Maritime incidents in Russia
Ships built by Sevmash